"Secrets" is a song by the British band Tears for Fears, released in the US as a second single from their fifth album, Raoul and the Kings of Spain (1995). The song was also initially planned for release as a single in the UK, but was withdrawn.

Critical reception
Steve Baltin from Cash Box wrote, "The latest release from the band’s strong Raoul And The Kings Of Spain CD is a lovely ballad that finds Roland Orzabal and musicians letting out a great deal of emotion. The result is a track that could fit in well at CHR, as well as Adult Contemporary. The band that once wanted to rule the world is growing up."

Track listing
 USCD5/34K 78253-2
 "Secrets" - 4:41
 "Break It Down Again" (Acoustic version) - (Roland Orzabal, Alan Griffiths)-3:42

 AUSTRALIACD5/663 061-1
 "Secrets" - 4:41
 "Break It Down Again" (Acoustic version) - (Roland Orzabal, Alan Griffiths)-3:42

 EuropeCD5/662 731-1
 "Secrets" - 4:42
 "War of Attrition" -(Roland Orzabal, Alan Griffiths)- 3:41

References

1996 singles
1995 songs
Tears for Fears songs
Songs written by Roland Orzabal
Epic Records singles